Patalene olyzonaria, the juniper-twig geometer, is a moth of the  family Geometridae. It is found from Quebec and New Hampshire to Florida, west to Texas, north to Wisconsin.

The wingspan is 21–25 mm. Adults are on wing from April to November. There are two to three generations per year.

The larvae feed on Juniperus species and at times Thuja occidentalis and possibly Pinus.

External links
Bug Guide
Images

Ourapterygini